David Brightbill may refer to:

 David J. Brightbill (born 1943), member of the Pennsylvania State Senate
 David K. Brightbill (1863–1949), North Dakota public servant and politician